Abubakr Kado was a Sultan of Kano who reigned from 1565-1573.

Biography in the Kano Chronicle
Below is a biography of Abubakr Kado from Palmer's 1908 English translation of the Kano Chronicle.

References

Monarchs of Kano